is a railway station on the Iwate Ginga Railway Line in the city of Ninohe, Iwate Prefecture, Japan, operated by the third-sector railway operator Iwate Ginga Railway Company.

Lines
Kintaichi-Onsen Station is served by the Iwate Ginga Railway Line, and is located 78.4 kilometers from the terminus of the line at Morioka Station and 613.7 kilometers from Tokyo Station.

Station layout
Kintaichi-Onsen Station has one island platform and a single side platform connected to the station building by a footbridge.

Platforms

Adjacent stations

History
It was renamed Kintaichi-Onsen Station on 1 February 1987. The station was absorbed into the JR East network upon the privatization of the Japanese National Railways (JNR) on 1 April 1987, and was transferred to the Iwate Ginga Railway on 1 September 2002.

Passenger statistics
In fiscal 2015, the station was used by an average of 186 passengers daily.

Surrounding area
 Kintaichi Onsen 
 Kintaichi Post Office

Bus services

JR Bus Tohoku
For Ninohe Station
For Karumai
Nanbu Bus
For Sannohe
For Ichinohe Station via Ninohe Station

See also
 List of railway stations in Japan

References

External links

 Kintaichi-Onsen Station information 

Railway stations in Iwate Prefecture
Iwate Galaxy Railway Line
Railway stations in Japan opened in 1909
Ninohe, Iwate